Wano Township is a township in Cheyenne County, Kansas, USA.  As of the 2000 census, its population was 2,104.

Geography
According to the USGS, it contains eight cemeteries: Emanuel, Gar, Hope Valley, Lawn Ridge, Saint Francis, Saint Pauls, Salem and Salem Evangelical.

The streams of Cherry Creek, Drury Creek, Fish Creek, Sand Creek, Spring Creek and West Fork Sand Creek run through this township.

Transportation
Wano Township contains two airports or landing strips: Cheyenne County Municipal Airport and Saint Francis Municipal Airport.

References
 USGS Geographic Names Information System (GNIS)

External links
 US-Counties.com
 City-Data.com

Townships in Cheyenne County, Kansas
Townships in Kansas